Alekseyenko, Alekseenko, Alexeenko is a Russified form of the Ukrainian surname Oleksiienko derived from the first name Oleksii (Oleksiy), (from Greek Alexius; Russian: Aleksey). Similar surname: Aleksenko. Notable people with the surname include:

 Kirill Alekseenko (born 1997), Russian chess grandmaster
Ilya Alekseyenko (1899–1941), Soviet general
 Mikhail Alekseyenko (1847–1917), Russian lawyer

See also
 

Russian-language surnames
Surnames of Ukrainian origin